Lloyd Spencer Spooner (October 6, 1884 – December 20, 1966) was an American sports shooter and Olympic champion.

He won four gold medals, one silver medal and two bronze medals at the 1920 Summer Olympics in Antwerp. Six of his seven medals were in team competitions, and the one individual bronze medal was obtained in the Military Rifle, Prone, 600m.

He was born in Tacoma, Washington and died in Zephyrhills, Florida.

See also
List of multiple Olympic gold medalists at a single Games

References

1884 births
1966 deaths
American male sport shooters
Shooters at the 1920 Summer Olympics
United States Distinguished Marksman
Olympic gold medalists for the United States in shooting
Olympic silver medalists for the United States in shooting
Olympic bronze medalists for the United States in shooting
Medalists at the 1920 Summer Olympics